Praia Clube is the professional women's volleyball team from Uberlândia, Minas Gerais which represents the social and sports club of the same name in the Brazilian Superleague. The club currently plays under the commercial name Dentil/Praia Clube.

Honors

International
 South American Championship (1): 2021

National
Brazilian Super League (first tier) (1): 2017-18 
Brazilian League (second tier) (2): 2008 and 2010

Regional
Minas Gerais State Championship (8): 2006, 2011, 2012, 2013, 2014, 2015, 2019, 2021

Team
''Season 2022-2023 squad

References 

Volleyball clubs established in 1989
1989 establishments in Brazil
Volleyball clubs in Minas Gerais (state)
Brazilian volleyball clubs